Enlow may refer to:

Enlow, Pennsylvania
Enlow (band)
Blayne Enlow, born 1999